The Municipality of Cankova is a municipality in the Prekmurje region of Slovenia. The seat of the municipality is the town of Cankova.

Settlements
In addition to the municipal seat of Cankova, the municipality also includes the following settlements:
 Domajinci
 Gerlinci
 Gornji Črnci
 Korovci
 Krašči
 Skakovci
 Topolovci

History
The area was originally part of the Municipality of Murska Sobota. In 1995, the Municipality of Cankova–Tišina was formed, which existed until 1999, when Tišina became a separate municipality.

References

External links

Municipality of Cankova on Geopedia
Municipality of Cankova website 

 
Cankova
1998 establishments in Slovenia